Sofosbuvir/velpatasvir/voxilaprevir, sold under the brand name Vosevi, is a fixed-dose combination medication for the treatment of hepatitis C. It combines three drugs that each act by a different mechanism of action against the hepatitis C virus: sofosbuvir, velpatasvir, and voxilaprevir.Vosevi was approved for medical use in the United States and in the European Union in July 2017. Vosevi is sold by Gilead Sciences.

References

External links
 

Combination drugs
NS3/4A protease inhibitors
NS5B (polymerase) inhibitors
NS5A inhibitors